John Whetten Ehninger (July 22, 1827 New York City - January 22, 1889 Saratoga, New York) was a United States painter and etcher.

Biography
He graduated from Columbia University in 1847. He was a pupil of Couture in Paris 1848–1849, and afterward studied at Düsseldorf and other art centres 1851–1852.

Ehninger moved to Europe after graduating from Columbia University. There, he pursued his academic training in France, Germany, and Italy. A budding artist, he was eager to learn more about the old masters and to hone his skills. He spent some time in Germany. During his time there he developed a penchant for drawing scenes of daily life, a trait that was to remain for the rest of his career.

Return to New York
After nearly three years in Europe, Ehninger returned to the U.S. and began living in New York City. Six years of working and exhibiting in the city followed. In 1860, he became a member of the National Academy of Design. Ehninger took another trip to Europe. After returning from that trip he settled in Newport, Rhode Island. A few years after, in 1872, he moved to Saratoga, New York, where he spent the rest of his life.

Among his paintings, which include landscape and figure subjects, are:

 "Peter Stuyvesant" (1850)
 "Autumn Landscape" (1867)
 "Monk" (1871)
 "Vintage in the Valtella" (1877)
 "Twilight from the Bridge of Pau" (1878)
 "Death and the Gambler" (Saratoga, 1895)
 "New England Farmyard"
 "Yankee Peddler"
 "Love me, Love my Horse"
 "The Foray"
 "The Sword"
 "Lady Jane Grey"
 "Christ Healing the Sick"

He was a clever and versatile draftsman and is perhaps best known for his illustrations of Longfellow's Miles Standish (1858) and Irving's Dolph Heylinger and Ye Legend of St. Gwendolyn (1867).  The drawings for the latter were considered so delicate that they were reproduced by photography — an unusual method in that day.

References

 

Attribution
 

19th-century American painters
American male painters
1827 births
1889 deaths
Kunstakademie Düsseldorf alumni
Painters from New York City
19th-century American male artists